Braydon Maurice Ennor (born 16 July 1997) is a New Zealand rugby union player who currently plays as a wing and centre for  in the Mitre 10 Cup and Crusaders in super rugby.

Youth and school
Ennor was born in Auckland, New Zealand to Zimbabwean parents. He studied at, captained and represented Saint Kentigern College in rugby, generally playing centre. He made the Blues Under 18 Development side in 2014. He was the Hamilton House Leader and was awarded The Bruce Palmer Memorial Cup for the Boys Runner-up to the Dux Ludorum as well as The Headmaster's Medal for Service House Leader Hamilton in his final year and St Kentigern.

After graduating high school, In early 2016, he went to the University of Canterbury on a scholarship for a commerce degree, majoring in Business administration after getting snapped up by the Crusaders Academy side. He represented Canterbury in the Jock Hobbs Memorial National U19 tournament after returning from a 9-month ACL injury in September 2015. after which he went onto represent the Crusaders development team, The Knights in 2017.

International career
His performance for the Knights saw him getting picked by the New Zealand under-20 for the Oceania Under 20 tournament in April 2017 after which he was named in the NZ u20 side for the 2017 World Rugby Under 20 Championship in Georgia. He helped NZ win the 2017 tournament. He played in 4 of the 5 games at outside centre including the final and he scored 2 tries in the tournament.

Canterbury and the Crusaders
In August 2017, he was named in the  side for the 2017 Mitre 10 Cup. He made his debut on 1 September against Hawkes Bay scoring 2 tries on debut. He scored 4 tries in the following game against Southland. His performance saw him getting signed by the Crusaders for the 2018 and 2019 Super Rugby season.

References

External links
 

1997 births
Living people
Canterbury rugby union players
Rugby union wings
People educated at Saint Kentigern College
Rugby union centres
University of Canterbury alumni
Crusaders (rugby union) players
Rugby union players from Auckland
New Zealand international rugby union players
New Zealand rugby union players